"Words and Deeds"  is the eleventh episode of the third season of House and the fifty-seventh episode overall. This episode concludes the Michael Tritter story arc that began in the episode "Fools for Love".

Plot
Derek, a firefighter, has just escaped a burning building when he begins to have trouble breathing and becomes delirious. He then staggers over to the burning building before being stopped by fellow firefighter, Amy. Derek complains that he is freezing even though he is within yards of the burning building.

The first diagnosis is MRSA to which Derek asks if that is what makes him see blue. Dr. Cameron realizes that this is something entirely different and House suggests male menopause (high estrogen, low testosterone levels). House orders a hormone panel. The team tests for this latest theory but Derek becomes disturbed and begins to strangle Cameron. Meanwhile, House visits Tritter and although House apologizes, Tritter ignores him and says he only cares about House's actions.

Back at the hospital, Foreman insists it must be neurological and asks CT the brain and gives lumbar puncture to test for meningitis. House agrees, then leaves and reveals that he is checking himself into rehab. Derek begins to have trouble breathing and it is discovered that he is having another heart attack. The team goes to House for advice who tells them to look at what was in common during this attack and the previous two he had: Amy was present. To test this, the team brings Amy in with Derek. Both confused, Derek suddenly goes into another heart attack. Derek reveals that his brother is dating and engaged to Amy and Cameron realizes that Derek is so in love with Amy that it is literally killing him to see her with another man: Broken heart syndrome. Rather than tell Amy his true feelings, he agrees to electroshock therapy to remove his memories of Amy - and every other memory he has. Cuddy and Derek both consent. Back in rehab, Tritter then comes to visit, and admits that he is surprised to see House in rehab, though he still refuses to drop the charges against him, saying that even his actions lie.

The procedure is performed successfully. When Amy and Derek's brother walk in, he has no idea who they are. Outside the room, Cameron apologizes to Amy for the burden of caring for Derek landing so soon before her wedding. However, Amy has no idea what she is talking about as she's not even dating Derek's brother. Meanwhile, House and Wilson meet in rehab. House apologizes to Wilson for everything.

The team calls House who is at trial and says that the engagement was a fabricated memory and was not true. House rushes out of court (risking being held in contempt by the judge) back to the hospital. The team diagnoses Derek with a spinal meningioma that restricted blood to his brain, creating the false memories. They treat the meningioma, so his brain can start generating real memories again. 

In the courtroom, Cuddy is at the stand and is confronted with the log book that shows House's signature taking oxycodone in the name of a dead patient. Cuddy then testifies that she replaced the pills with a placebo and produces inventory logs to prove it. The case is dismissed and the judge orders Tritter to stop his investigation on House. The judge tells Tritter that he is clearly mad at House for something he did, but that he needs to get over it and move on. However, House is ordered to spend the night in jail for contempt and to complete his rehab. Before he is taken away, House and Tritter have one last exchange. House asks if he should be concerned that Tritter will come after him over something else in the future. Tritter simply wishes House luck and says "I hope I'm wrong about you."

Cuddy and Wilson both visit House that night. Cuddy is infuriated with him because she was forced to fabricate evidence and commit perjury so that his case would be dismissed. She tells House that she now "owns him", and House agrees. Wilson gives House the pills from the rehab department. Wilson realizes it is Vicodin when House greedily takes them. House has bribed the rehab supervisor to give him Vicodin. Wilson says that nothing has changed. When Wilson realizes and remarks that House did not need to apologize to him to maintain his deception, House merely answers ambiguously, "Believe what you want." In the background plays "Season of the Witch" by Donovan.

References

External links
 FOX.com-House official site
 

House (season 3) episodes
2007 American television episodes
Television episodes directed by Daniel Sackheim

fr:Cœurs brisés (Dr House)
it:Episodi di Dr. House - Medical Division (terza stagione)#Parole e fatti